Rudolf Polame (28 March 1910 – 6 January 1996) was a Czech athlete. He competed in the men's long jump at the 1936 Summer Olympics.

References

External links
 

1910 births
1996 deaths
Athletes (track and field) at the 1936 Summer Olympics
Czech male long jumpers
Olympic athletes of Czechoslovakia
Sportspeople from Přerov